Digitalose is a deoxy sugar that is a component of various cardiac glycosides including thevetin and emicymarin.  It was first reported in 1892 as being obtained by the hydrolysis of Digtalinum verum.  The chemical structure was first elucidated in 1943 by the German chemist Otto Schmidt.  Chemically, it is a methyl ether of D-fucose.

See also
 Sarmentose, a related deoxy sugar

References

Deoxy sugars
Ethers